CHR or chr may refer to:

Organisations
 Canadians for Health Research, a national not-for-profit organisation
 Centre for Human Rights, an organisation promoting human rights in Africa
 Christ Church Secondary School, a government-aided school in Woodlands, Singapore
 Commission on Human Rights (Philippines), an independent constitutional office

Science and technology
 .CHR, a stroke file format in the Borland Graphics Interface
 Chromosome, a DNA molecule with genetic material
 Constraint Handling Rules, a computer programming language

Other uses
 chr, the code for Cherokee language in ISO 639-2 and ISO 639-3
 Canadian Historical Review, a scholarly journal
 Châteauroux-Centre "Marcel Dassault" Airport, a French airport (IATA code: CHR)
 Chatham House Rule, whereby information from a discussion can be used but the source not named
 Christmas Island, ITU code
 Contemporary hit radio, a radio format playing current popular music
 Toyota C-HR, a subcompact crossover SUV